Tsai Ming-kai (born 6 April 1950, in Taiwan) is a Taiwanese entrepreneur, currently Chairman of MediaTek.

In 2014, according to Forbes he was ranked 20th Taiwanese by net worth ($1.80 billion). In 2014 he was 21st in the "Best-Performing CEOs in the World" ranking by Harvard Business Review.

In 2016 he received the Morris Chang Exemplary Leadership Award for pioneering the Taiwan semiconductor design industry.

References

1950 births
Living people
Taiwanese billionaires
Taiwanese businesspeople